Richard Taylor Smith (June 28, 1967 – July 21, 2007) was an American professional golfer.

Smith was born in Pensacola, Florida but spent most of his life in Waycross, Georgia. He played college golf at Augusta College (now Augusta State University).

Smith played on the Ben Hogan Tour/Nike Tour (now Web.com Tour) and the PGA Tour from 1992 to 1998. His best finish on the Web.com Tour (1992–1995, 1998) was a win at the 1992 Ben Hogan Permian Basin Open. His best finish on the PGA Tour (1996–1997) was T-2 at the 1996 Greater Vancouver Open.

At the 1996 Walt Disney World/Oldsmobile Classic on the PGA Tour, Smith had tied Tiger Woods at the end of regulation play and appeared to be heading for a playoff. It was then revealed that Smith's putter had an illegal grip and he was disqualified, giving Woods his second career win. Smith had been informed about his putter on the 9th hole but was allowed to continue playing while he appealed the ruling. The appeal was denied.

Professional wins (1)

Ben Hogan Tour wins (1)

See also
1995 PGA Tour Qualifying School graduates

References

External links

American male golfers
Augusta Jaguars men's golfers
PGA Tour golfers
Golfers from Florida
Golfers from Georgia (U.S. state)
Golfers from Houston
Sportspeople from Pensacola, Florida
People from Waycross, Georgia
1967 births
2007 deaths